Strabena is an Afrotropical butterfly genus endemic to Madagascar from the subfamily Satyrinae in the family Nymphalidae.

Species
Strabena affinis  Oberthür, 1916
Strabena albivittula  (Mabille, [1880])
Strabena andilabe  Paulian, 1951
Strabena andriana  Mabille, [1885]
Strabena argyrina  Mabille, 1878
Strabena batesii  (C. & R. Felder, [1867])
Strabena cachani  Paulian, 1950
Strabena consobrina  Oberthür, 1916
Strabena consors  Oberthür, 1916
Strabena daphne  Viette, 1971
Strabena dyscola  Mabille, 1880
Strabena eros  Viette, 1971
Strabena excellens  (Butler, 1885)
Strabena germanus  Oberthür, 1916
Strabena goudoti  (Mabille, [1885])
Strabena ibitina  (Ward, 1873)
Strabena impar  Oberthür, 1916
Strabena isoalensis  Paulian, 1951
Strabena mabillei  (Aurivillius, 1898)
Strabena mandraka  Paulian, 1951
Strabena martini  Oberthür, 1916
Strabena modesta  Oberthür, 1916
Strabena modestissima  Oberthür, 1916
Strabena mopsus  (Mabille, 1878)
Strabena nepos  Oberthür, 1916
Strabena niveata  (Butler, 1879)
Strabena perrieri  Paulian, 1951
Strabena perroti  Oberthür, 1916
Strabena rakoto  (Ward, 1870)
Strabena smithii  Mabille, 1877
Strabena soror  Oberthur, 1916
Strabena sufferti  (Aurivillius, 1898)
Strabena tamatavae  (Boisduval, 1833)
Strabena triophthalma  Mabille, [1885]
Strabena tsaratananae  Paulian, 1951
Strabena vinsoni  (Guenée, 1865)
Strabena zanjuka  Mabille, [1885]

References

External links 
Seitz, A. Die Gross-Schmetterlinge der Erde 13: Die Afrikanischen Tagfalter. Plate XIII 29

 
Butterfly genera
Taxa named by Paul Mabille